Barbee Draw is a valley and an arroyo tributary to the Rincon Arroyo in Doña Ana and Sierra County, New Mexico. Rincon Arroyo is itself a tributary of the Rio Grande.

References 

Valleys of New Mexico
Landforms of Doña Ana County, New Mexico
Landforms of Sierra County, New Mexico
Bodies of water of Doña Ana County, New Mexico
Bodies of water of Sierra County, New Mexico
Tributaries of the Rio Grande